The 1938–39 LFF Lyga was the 18th season of the LFF Lyga football competition in Lithuania.  It was contested by 8 teams, and LGSF Kaunas won the championship.

League standings

References
RSSSF

LFF Lyga seasons
Lith
1938 in Lithuanian football
1939 in Lithuanian football